Restaurator (Polish Restorer) is the fourth studio album by Polish rapper Tau, released December 15, 2015 by his own record label Bozon Records. It is his second album released after changing his stage name from Medium to Tau. The album features no guest appearances except several background vocalists.

The album was produced by Chris Carson, Gawvi, Gibbs Julas, o. Jakub Waszkowiak, Pawbeats, Sherlock, SoDrumatic, Zdolny and Tau himself. Restaurator was promoted with three singles, i.e. "Restaurator" released on October 21, 2015, "Pinokyo" released on November 19, 2015, and "Miłosierdzie" released on October 10, 2015. For two of the three tracks videos were made.

The album debuted at number 28 on the Polish OLiS chart.

Track listing 

Sample credits
 "Przybysz" contains a sample from "The Lady in My Life" performed by Michael Jackson.

References

External links 
 Restaurator at Discogs.

2015 albums
Polish-language albums
Tau albums
Albums produced by Tau
Bozon Records albums